The 1957 Southern Area League was the fourth season of the Southern Area League but the first as the regional second tier of speedway racing in the United Kingdom for Southern British teams.

Summary
California Poppies were no longer competitors with the promotion and nickname moving to Aldershot. Southern Rovers who had no track in the previous season had found a home at Rayleigh

Southern Rovers were the champions.

Final table

See also
List of United Kingdom Speedway League Champions
Knockout Cup (speedway)

References

Southern Area League
1957 in speedway